Satovcha (old version: Satovitsa, Svatovitsa) is a village in Southwestern Bulgaria. It is the administrative center of the Satovcha Municipality in Blagoevgrad Province.

Geography

The village of Satovcha is located in the Western Rhodope Mountains. It belongs to the Chech region.

History

According to Vasil Kanchov, in 1900, Satovcha was populated by 832 Bulgarian Muslims and 650 Bulgarian Christians.

Religions

Both Muslims and Christians inhabit the village.

Popular culture
The village has greatly expanded in the last few years in aspects such as hotels, restaurants, supermarkets, and the town center. The main hotel serving the municipality is the three star Zenit hotel. The village is home to three supermarkets.

Satovcha provides the background for the 2013 Bulgarian film "Soul Food Stories."

Honours
Satovcha Peak in Antarctica is named after the village.

References

Villages in Blagoevgrad Province
Chech